Bellwether Gallery was a New York City art gallery based in Chelsea. Director and owner Becky Smith was recognized as an important promoter of emerging artists since the gallery's 1999 opening in the Greenpoint neighborhood of Brooklyn. The gallery moved to Chelsea in 2005 and closed in 2009.

Some of the artists represented by Bellwether:

John Bauer
Tanyth Berkeley
Ion Birch
Corinne Botz
Clayton Brothers
Adam Cvijanovic
Daphne Fitzpatrick
Dana Frankfort
Anne Hardy
Nathan Mabry
Trevor Paglen
Ruth Root
Amanda Ross-Ho
Allison Smith
Marc Swanson
Ellen Altfest

References

External links

Contemporary art galleries in the United States
Defunct art museums and galleries in Manhattan
1999 establishments in New York City
2009 disestablishments in New York (state)
Art galleries established in 1999
Art galleries disestablished in 2009